In molecular biology, Phosphotyrosine-binding domains  are protein domains which bind to phosphotyrosine.

The phosphotyrosine-binding domain (PTB, also phosphotyrosine-interaction or PI domain) in the protein tensin tends to be found at the C-terminus.  Tensin is a multi-domain protein that binds to actin filaments and functions as a focal-adhesion molecule (focal adhesions are regions of plasma membrane through which cells attach to the extracellular matrix).  Human tensin has actin-binding sites, an SH2 domain and a region similar to the tumour suppressor PTEN. The PTB domain interacts with the cytoplasmic tails of beta integrin by binding to an NPXY motif.

The phosphotyrosine-binding domain of insulin receptor substrate-1 is not related to the phosphotyrosine-binding domain of tensin.
Insulin receptor substrate-1 proteins contain both a pleckstrin homology domain and a phosphotyrosine binding (PTB) domain. The PTB domains facilitate interaction with the activated tyrosine-phosphorylated insulin receptor. The PTB domain is situated towards the N terminus. Two arginines in this domain are responsible for hydrogen bonding phosphotyrosine residues on an  Ac-LYASSNPApY-NH2 peptide in the juxtamembrane region of the insulin receptor. Further interactions via "bridged" water molecules are coordinated by residues an Asn and a Ser residue. The PTB domain has a compact, 7-stranded beta-sandwich structure, capped by a C-terminal helix. The substrate peptide fits into an L-shaped surface cleft formed from the C-terminal helix and strands 5 and 6.

Human proteins containing these domains
APBA1; APBA2; APBA3; APPL1; EPS8; EPS8L1; EPS8L2; EPS8L3; TENC1; TNS; TNS1; TNS3; TNS4; DOK1; DOK2; DOK3; DOK4; DOK5; DOK6; DOK7; FRS2; FRS3; IRS1; IRS2; IRS4; NOS1AP; TLN1; TLN2

See also
SH2 domains also bind phosphorylated tyrosines

References

External links
 

Protein domains
Protein families
Membrane proteins